is a stadium in Akita, Akita Prefecture, Japan.

The gymnasium was built in 1968. Yoshio Kobayashi and Masatoshi Soh were the architects. Masao Sitoh and Arata Ono were the structural engineers.

The gymnasium has two separate facilities. The "large gymnasium" has a floor area of 1736 sq.meters, and a capacity of 6000 spectators. It can be divided into two basketball, two volleyball, two tennis, 10 badminton or 20 table tennis competitions, or can be used for gymnastics, wrestler, boxing, fencing or other activities. The "small gymnasium" has a floor area of 463.1 sq.meters, and can be used for one volleyball, two badminton, two tennis, or other events.

Akita Prefectural Gymnasium hosted the 1979 World Boxing Association World Junior middleweight title match between Masashi Kudo of Japan against Ayub Kalule of Uganda on 24 October 1979.

There is no air conditioning in the gym.

Entertainment events
Chage and Aska 20-21 October 1993
Kazumasa Oda 15 April 2012 
Dreams Come True 19-20 March 2016

Sports events
Kirin World Basketball - University of Kentucky vs Japan 7 July, 1982
Ju-jitsu at the 2001 World Games - 19–20 August 2001
Kirin Cup Basketball - Portugal vs Japan 24 July, 2003
Wheel Gymnastics World Team Cup  April 21, 2019

Access

From Akita Station:  for Rinkai Eigyosho, Tsuchizaki via Terauchi etc. Get off at Kenritsu Taiikukan-mae.

References

External links
  Akita Prefectural Gymnasium 

1968 establishments in Japan
2001 World Games
Akita Northern Happinets
Boxing venues in Japan
Gyms
Sports venues completed in 1968
Sports venues in Akita Prefecture
Buildings and structures in Akita (city)
Indoor arenas in Japan
Basketball venues in Japan